The 2020 SBS Entertainment Awards presented by Seoul Broadcasting System (SBS), took place on December 19, 2020, at SBS Prism Tower in Sangam-dong, Mapo-gu, Seoul. It was hosted by Shin Dong-yup, Cha Eun-woo, Lee Seung-gi. The nominees were chosen from SBS variety, talk, and comedy shows that aired from December 2019 to November 2020.

Nominations and winners

Presenters

Special performances 
Sources:

See also
 2020 KBS Entertainment Awards
 2020 MBC Entertainment Awards

References

External links 
  

Seoul Broadcasting System original programming
SBS Entertainment Awards
2020 television awards
2020 in South Korea
2020 in South Korean television